"Omen III" is a song by German Eurodance band Magic Affair, which consisted of vocalist Franca Morgano and rapper A.K. Swift. Released in January 1994 as the lead single from their debut album, Omen (The Story Continues...) (1994), it is also their most successful song. It peaked at number-one in Germany, and number two in both Austria and Finland. In Germany alone it has sold 750,000 copies and Gold status on the single were achieved within just eight weeks of release. On the UK Singles Chart, it reached number 17 and sold under 180,000 copies, missing the silver certification just barely. Magic Affair won the 1994 Echo award in Germany, for the best German dance single with "Omen III".

Background
Magic Affair have only performed the third in the 'Omen' series, which all were produced and created by Frankfurt DJ Michael Staab (aka Mike Staab). The previous two Omen singles released back in '89 by Sony were sung by German dance floor house act Mysterious Art, which was founded in 1988. The first single, titled "Das Omen (Teil 1)" went to number-one and sold over half-a-million units in the GSA territories alone. It remained for nine weeks straight as number-one on the West German singles chart. The second, "Carma (Omen 2)" was released later that year and climbed to number nine, while the debut album, Omen - The Story was slow to take off, selling just 70.000 units and failing to make it into the charts.

Chart performance
"Omen III" was very successful on the charts across Europe, remaining the band's biggest hit to date. It peaked at number-one in Germany, and number two in Austria and Finland. Additionally, the single peaked within the top 10 also in Belgium, Denmark, the Netherlands, Sweden (#3) and Switzerland (#3), as well as on the Eurochart Hot 100, where it climbed to a very respectable number five position. In the United Kingdom, it reached the top 20, peaking at number 17 in its first week on the UK Singles Chart, on 29 May. But on the UK Dance Singles Chart, it was more successful, reaching number 12. Outside Europe, "Omen III" was a huge hit in Israel, where it peaked at number five. It earned a gold record in Austria, with a sale of 15,000 singles, and a platinum record in Germany, after 500,000 units were sold. Magic Affair was also awarded the German 1994 Echo award for the best German dance single with "Omen III".

Critical reception
Larry Flick from Billboard felt that Magic Affair "exerts tremendous energy in its effort to be rousing and ominous at the same time, with jarring and amusing results. Track rolls into the States on the power of massive European club and sales success, and is ripe for similar acceptance here. The swirling layers of glossy synths are positively hypnotic, driven home by a pounding hi-NRG beat." Hannsjörg Riemann from German Bravo gave it four out of five, writing, "The Frankfurt dance floor formation is up and running again with a new line-up. "Omen III", a fast, hot 3:56-minute techno piece, sounds like a hit." James Masterton stated in his weekly UK chart commentary, "Euro-disco strikes again, shooting "Omen III" in from nowhere. You can see instantly why it is such a hit, girlie vocals and a high-speed rap combining in a commercial formula that may well last another year before it finally runs out of steam." 

Pan-European magazine Music & Media noted, "Now he [Mike Staab] figures the time is right for a new lineup and Part III. At 138 bpm, it's maybe even harder hitting than its predecessors." Alan Jones from Music Week rated it four out of five, adding, "Frantic Teutonic dance, a la Snap, Culture Beat et al, and likely to achieve the same kind of crossover success, because it has an irresistible hook." James Hamilton from the RM Dance Update deemed it a "sinister effects and 'Valkyries' started Culture Beat-like frantic shrill 0-137.6-0bpm German smash".

Music video
A music video was produced to promote the single, featuring the band performing inside a haunted house. Singer Franca Morgano appears as a witch, while rapper A.K. Swift raps among vampire-like females. The video was A-listed on Germany's VIVA in February 1994. "Omen III" was later published on YouTube in July 2014, and as of December 2022, it had generated more than 17 million views.

Track listings

 7-inch (UK, 1994)
"Omen III" (single version) – 3:56
"Omen III" (instrumental) – 4:40

 12-inch (Germany, 1993)
"Omen III" – 6:10
"Omen III" (instrumental version) – 4:40

 CD maxi-single (Germany, 1993)
"Omen III" (single version) – 3:56
"Omen III" (maxi version) – 6:10
"Omen III" (instrumental version) – 4:40

 CD maxi-single (Europe, 1994)
"Omen III" (Cyber-Remix) – 5:10
"Omen III" (Cyber-Hyper-Remix) – 7:29
"Omen III" (single version) – 3:56

 '''CD maxi-single (US, 1994)
"Omen III" (original single version) – 3:56
"Omen III" (Cutler Ridge edit) – 3:59
"Omen III" (original maxi version) – 6:10
"Omen III" (Cutler Ridge extended mix) – 7:18
"Omen III" (Straight from Under G mix) – 5:05

Charts

Weekly charts

Year-end charts

Certifications

Release history

References

1993 songs
1994 debut singles
Electrola singles
EMI Records singles
English-language German songs
Magic Affair songs
Number-one singles in Germany